Dagmeh Daghildi (also Romanized as Dagmeh Dāghīldī; also known as Dagmeh Dāgheldī, Dagmeh Dāghīl, Dagmeh Dāghūn, Daimadaghli, Dogmeh, Dogmeh Dāghūn, Dokmah Dāghlūy, and Dokmeh Dāghīl) is a village in Yurchi-ye Gharbi Rural District, Kuraim District, Nir County, Ardabil Province, Iran. At the 2006 census, its population was 28, in 8 families.

References 

Towns and villages in Nir County